St. Louis-San Francisco Railway 1630 is a preserved 2-10-0 "Decapod" type steam locomotive owned and operated by the Illinois Railway Museum in Union, Illinois. Today, Frisco No. 1630 is currently one of two operating Decapods in service in America, the other being former Great Western No. 90 at the Strasburg Rail Road outside of Strasburg, Pennsylvania. No. 1630 is also one of three operational steam locomotives at the Illinois Railway Museum, the other two being J. Neils Lumber Co. 3-truck Shay No. 5 and the soon-to-be restored Union Pacific 2-8-0 No. 428.

History
The locomotive was built in 1918 by the Baldwin Locomotive Works for use in Russia as a class Ye locomotive. However, it, along with about 200 other locomotives, remained in the United States because the Bolshevik government could not pay for them after the Russian Revolution. It was converted from  Russian track gauge to  standard gauge. After being re-gauged, the locomotive was sold to the USRA and was numbered 1147. Shortly after, it was briefly leased for use on the Pennsylvania Railroad. In 1920, the locomotive was sold to the St. Louis – San Francisco Railway, also known as the "Frisco", where it was used as a mixed traffic engine. In 1951, the locomotive was sold to Eagle-Picher, which used it to haul lead ore from a mine to their smelter.

In 1967, the locomotive was donated to the Illinois Railway Museum in Union, Illinois where they began restoring it in 1972 and returned it to operating condition and revenue runs in 1974. Sometime after arriving at the museum, the locomotive was restored from her Eagle Picher appearance to its Frisco appearance. The locomotive was taken out of service in 2004, and after more than six years undergoing repairs and a federally mandated rebuild, it was returned back to operating condition on October 30, 2013. On Memorial Day weekend 2014, the locomotive returned to excursion service. In 2016, the locomotive received a cylinder overhaul, which, according to Steam department curator Nigel Bennett, made the locomotive "probably more powerful than she has been since her [sic] first arrival at IRM in the 1970’s." The locomotive, during Memorial Day weekend 2016, pulled 135 empty coal cars in storage at the museum as what was considered to be one of the longest revenue freight trains powered by a steam locomotive in at least 25 years, Bennett said.

On the evening of September 14, 2019, during the Museum Showcase Weekend, the locomotive doubleheaded with recently restored J. Neils Lumber Co. No. 5 (aka Shay No. 5), as this was the first time a doubleheader has been seen at the Illinois Railway Museum in a long time. As of 2021, the locomotive continues to run in excursion service for the Illinois Railway Museum.

Popular culture
The locomotive appears in some sequences in an episode of the 1982 TV series American Playhouse, "Any Friend of Nicholas Nickelby is a Friend of Mine."
In 1992 the locomotive appeared in the movie A League of Their Own as well as, in 1991, the locomotive appeared in the movie The Babe in the transportation scenes, which were both filmed at IRM.

See also 

 Chicago and North Western 1385
 McCloud Railway 19
 Polson Logging Co. 2
 Soo Line 1003
 Soo Line 2719

References

External links
 Frisco 1630 Restoration
 Operational Steam Locomotives Steam Railroading

Railway locomotives introduced in 1918
St. Louis–San Francisco Railway locomotives
2-10-0 locomotives
Standard gauge locomotives of the United States
Individual locomotives of the United States
Preserved steam locomotives of Illinois